Andre Applewhaite is a Barbadian professional footballer who plays as a left back for Weymouth Wales.

References

External links

Living people
2002 births
Barbadian footballers
Barbados international footballers
Association football defenders